The European Wushu Championships is a wushu competition organized by the European Wushu Federation, an official continental federation of the International Wushu Federation. The first championships were held in Brussels, Belgium in May 1986, with 70 athletes from eight participating member countries.

EWUF

Championships (Senior / Junior) 

 16TH EUROPEAN WUSHU CHAMPIONSHIPS and 9TH EUROPEAN JUNIOR WUSHU CHAMPIONSHIPS	: http://competitionbook.com/public_lists/index/43
 17TH EUROPEAN WUSHU CHAMPIONSHIPS and 10TH EUROPEAN JUNIOR WUSHU CHAMPIONSHIPS : http://www.competitionbook.com/public_lists/index/88

List of European Traditional Wushu (Kungfu) Championships 

 http://competitionbook.com/
 http://competitionbook.com/public_lists/index/67

List of European Taijiquan and Internal Styles Wushu Championships

List of European Yongchunquan (Wingchun) Championships

List of European Cailifo and Hongjia Championships

EUWUF
1st EUWUF European championship – 2022 in Burgas,

Results
https://www.competitionbook.com/

http://lwuf.lv/gb/competitions/2015-year

http://lwuf.lv/gb/competitions/2016-year

http://lwuf.lv/gb/competitions/2017-year

http://lwuf.lv/gb/competitions/2018-year

http://lwuf.lv/gb/competitions/2019-year

http://lwuf.lv/gb/competitions/2020-year

http://lwuf.lv/gb/competitions/2021-year

http://lwuf.lv/gb/competitions/2022-year

https://ewuf.org/

https://www.euwuf.org/documents.html

https://web.archive.org/web/20220314143053/https://ewuf.org/

https://web.archive.org/web/20120602054634/http://www.ewuf.org/results.html

https://web.archive.org/web/20120603105725/http://www.ewuf.org/results-of-the-1st-european-traditional-wushu-championships.html

https://web.archive.org/web/20120601011028/http://14theuropeanwushuchampionships.weebly.com/final-results.html

https://web.archive.org/web/2013*/http://www.ewuf.org/results.html

https://www.competitionbook.com/competitions/viewpublic/43

https://www.euwuf.org/1st-euwuf-european-championship-great-success-for-all-participants.html

https://burgas2022.com/

https://fdocuments.net/document/16th-european-wushu-championships-and-9th-european-junior-16th-european-wushu.html

https://fdocuments.net/document/16th-european-wushu-championships-and-9th-european-junior-16th-european-wushu.html?page=11

https://fdocuments.net/document/competition-book-hkfhu-1st-european-shaolin-wushu-championships-hungary.html

https://fdocuments.net/document/results-sanda-oceania-kung-fu-wushu-2018-oceania-kung-fu-wushu-championships.html

https://fdocuments.net/document/european-wushu-federationwushu-european-wushu-federation-16th-european-wushu-championships.html

https://fdocuments.net/document/5th-european-kungfu-traditional-wushu-championships-2019-10-05-5th-european.html

https://fdocuments.net/document/results-sanda-kung-fu-wushu-australia-2014-australian-kung-fu-wushu-championships.html

https://fdocuments.net/document/european-bowhunting-championships-2011-barebow-recurve-european-bowhunting.html

https://fdocuments.net/document/the-1st-asian-traditional-wushuikung-fui-the-1st-asian-traditional-wushuikung-fui.html

https://fdocuments.net/document/18th-european-wushu-championships-regulations-18th-european-wushu-championships.html

https://fdocuments.net/document/2nd-european-taijiquan-and-internal-wushu-moscow-taolu-protocols-european2nd.html

https://fdocuments.net/document/4rd-european-taijiquan-and-neijiaquan-championships-2019-12-02-european-wushu.html

References

External links 
 European Wushu Federation
 Wushu Competitions
 http://wfa-asia.org/uploads/ueditor/php/upload/file/20181203/1543811659794342.pdf
 https://kwfroc.ickf-kuoshu.org/?page_id=2426 
 https://web.archive.org/web/20190614193539/http://wfa-asia.org/en/uploads/ueditor/php/upload/file/20171004/1507109365192385.pdf
 https://web.archive.org/web/20170622202613/http://wfa-asia.org:80/en/list-29/72

 
Wushu
Wushu competitions